Syntax, in linguistics, is a set of rules governing how words combine to form grammatical meanings.

Syntax may also refer to the following: 
 Syntax (journal), a Blackwell Publishing journal devoted to natural language syntax.
 Syntax (logic)
 Syntax (programming languages)
 Syntax (band)
 Syntax (television manufacturer)
 Syntax (typeface)
 SYNTAX, a compiler-generation system

See also 
 Syntaxis (disambiguation)
 Sin tax